Fiona Erdmann (born 9 September 1988) is a German model and reality television contestant.

Erdmann finished in fourth place on the second cycle of Germany's Next Topmodel. She studied design and product design prior to being cast on the programme. She was the cover model for the May 2008 issue of Playboy in Germany, was featured in FHM Germany and shot for SKODA. She has been signed with Divina Model Management, Ice Models, MGM Models and Max Models. She was featured in a commercial for Axe and for German clothing line Jungstil. She has walked for designers such as Patrick Mohr, Sebastian Ellrich and Irene Luft, and also walked in Mercedes Fashion Week.

External links
 
 

1988 births
Living people
German female models
Top Model contestants
People from Meldorf
Ich bin ein Star – Holt mich hier raus! participants